William Aiton (17312 February 1793) was a Scottish botanist.

Aiton was born near Hamilton. Having been regularly trained to the profession of a gardener, he travelled to London in 1754, and became assistant to Philip Miller, then superintendent of the Chelsea Physic Garden. In 1759 he was appointed director of the newly established botanical garden at Kew, where he remained until his death. He effected many improvements at the gardens, and in 1789 he published Hortus Kewensis, a catalogue of the plants cultivated there. He is buried at nearby St. Anne's Church, Kew.

A second and enlarged edition of the Hortus was brought out in 1810–1813 by his eldest son, William Townsend Aiton.

Aiton is commemorated in the specific epithet aitonis.

In 1789, he classified the Sampaguita plant to the Jasminium genus and also named it as Arabian Jasmine because it was believed that the plant originated from The Arabian Peninsula although the plant didn't originate from Arabia.

Selected publications

References

Bibliography 

 Pagmenta, Frank (2009) The Aitons: Gardeners to their Majesties. Richmond Local History Society.

Further reading 
 

1731 births
1793 deaths
18th-century British botanists
18th-century Scottish scientists
Botanists with author abbreviations
British horticulturists
British pteridologists
Burials at St. Anne's Church, Kew
Museum founders
People from South Lanarkshire
Royal Botanic Gardens, Kew
Scottish botanists
Scottish gardeners
Taxon authorities of Hypericum species
18th-century British philanthropists